Taylor Mackenzie is a former Grand Prix motorcycle racer based in Leicestershire, England. 
In late 2021, Mackenzie announced his intended retirement from racing at the end of the season. Shortly afterwards, it was announced that from the 2022 season, Mackenzie would be team manager for VisionTrack Honda Moto3, a new team in Moto3 headed by ex-racer Michael Laverty.

Mackenzie is the son of a former motorcycle racer Niall Mackenzie, and older brother to racer Tarran Mackenzie.

Racing history
Mackenzie retired from racing at the end of the 2021 British season where he competed in National Superstock 1000, finishing in fifth position.

For 2020, he competed in the British Superbike series, aboard a BMW, after the 2019 season on Superstock 1000. In a February 2021 Motorcycle News interview, he confirmed that he'd had a bad year and he was reliant upon funding provided through YouTube, Patreon and Amazon when trying to arrange a race machine for 2021.

For the first half of the BSB 2018 season, he rode for Moto Rapido Racing Ducati replacing injured John Hopkins. The team and Mackenzie announced their mutual decision to part company at the Knockhill BSB round practice session on 7 July, due to the rider's poor results. Mackenzie's place was taken by Tommy Bridewell for the remainder of 2018, who returned the team's best results in the Superbike class, scoring four podium finishes, narrowly missing out on a Showdown place and achieving the Riders' Cup at the season finale. Bridewell was retained for 2019.

In 2017, Mackenzie competed in the British Superbike Championship aboard a Suzuki GSX-R1000. Mackenzie has competed in the British 125GP Championship, the Red Bull MotoGP Rookies Cup, the British Supersport Championship and the British Superbike Championship. In 2016, Mackenzie won the National Superstock 1000 Championship aboard a BMW S1000RR for Hawk Racing/Buildbase BMW. In 2014, in his second year with Tyco Suzuki, achieved his first ever in the supersport class at Silverstone with a 2nd place finish. 

In 2010 Mackenzie rode two wildcard entries in the World Championship, at Silverstone and Valencia, prior to his full World Championship in 2011. During 2010 he finished the British 125 Championship in fourth position, competed in two CEV Buckler (Spanish National Championship) rounds and also rode in the Red Bull MotoGP Rookies Cup in which he scored five top-ten finishes.

Career statistics
2009 - 20th, Red Bull MotoGP Rookies Cup #71    KTM FRR 125
2009 - 11th, British 125cc Championship #77    Honda RS125R
2010 - 15th, Red Bull MotoGP Rookies Cup #77    KTM FRR 125
2010 - 4th, British 125cc Championship #77    Honda RS125R
2011 - 24th, 125cc Grand Prix World Championship #17    Aprilia RS 125 R
2012 - 14th, British Supersport Championship #77    Yamaha YZF-R6
2013 - 10th, British Supersport Championship #77    Suzuki GSX-R600
2014 - 10th, British Supersport Championship #77    Suzuki GSX-R600
2015 - NC, British Superbike Championship #11    Kawasaki ZX-10R
2016 - 1st, British National Superstock 1000 Championship #77    BMW S1000RR
2017 - 19th, British Superbike Championship #6    Suzuki GSX-R1000
2018 - British Superbike Championship #24    Ducati 1199 Panigale
2018 - British National Superstock 1000 Championship #77    BMW S1000RR

Grand Prix motorcycle racing

By season

Races by year
(key) (Races in bold indicate pole position, races in italics indicate fastest lap)

British Supersport Championship

Races by year
(key) (Races in bold indicate pole position, races in italics indicate fastest lap)

References

External links
 Profile on motogp.com

Living people
1993 births
British motorcycle racers
125cc World Championship riders